The cayenne pepper is a type of Capsicum annuum. It is usually a moderately hot chili pepper used to flavor dishes. Cayenne peppers are a group of tapering, 10 to 25 cm long, generally skinny, mostly red-colored peppers, often with a curved tip and somewhat rippled skin, which hang from the bush as opposed to growing upright. Most varieties are generally rated at 30,000 to 50,000 Scoville units.

The fruits are generally dried and ground to make the powdered spice of the same name, although cayenne powder may be a blend of different types of peppers, quite often not containing cayenne peppers, and may or may not contain the seeds.

Cayenne is used in cooking spicy dishes either as a powder or in its whole form. It is also used as an herbal supplement.

Etymology 
The word 'cayenne' is thought to be a corruption of the word kyynha, meaning "capsicum" in the Old Tupi language once spoken in Brazil. It is probable that the town Cayenne in French Guiana is related to the name, and the town may have been named for the pepper. Nicholas Culpeper used the phrase "cayenne pepper" in 1652, and the city was only renamed as such in 1777. It also is possibly named for the Cayenne River.

Taxonomy 
The cayenne pepper is a type of Capsicum annuum, as are bell peppers, jalapeños, pimientos, and many others. The genus Capsicum is in the nightshade family, (Solanaceae). Cayenne peppers are often said to belong to the frutescens variety, but frutescens peppers are now defined as peppers which have fruit which grow upright on the bush (such as tabasco peppers), thus what is known in English as cayenne peppers are by definition not frutescens. Culpeper, in his Complete Herbal from 1653, mentions cayenne pepper as a synonym for what he calls "pepper (guinea)" By the end of the 19th century "Guinea pepper" had come to mean bird's eye chili or piri-piri, although he refers to Capsicum peppers in general in his entry.

In the 19th century, modern cayenne peppers were classified as C. longum, this name was later synonymised with C. frutescens. Cayenne powder, however, has generally been made from the bird's eye peppers, in the 19th century classified as C. minimum.

Varieties 

There are many specific cultivars, such as 'Cow-horn', 'Cayenne Sweet', 'Cayenne Buist's Yellow', 'Golden Cayenne', 'Cayenne Carolina', 'Cayenne Indonesian', 'Joe's Long', 'Cayenne Large Red Thick', 'Cayenne Long Thick Red', 'Ring of Fire', 'Cayenne Passion', 'Cayenne Thomas Jefferson', 'Cayenne Iberian', 'Cayenne Turkish', 'Egyptian Cayenne', 'Cayenne Violet' or 'Numex Las Cruces Cayenne'. Although most modern cayenne peppers are colored red, yellow and purple varieties exist, and in the 19th century yellow varieties were common. Most types are moderately hot, although a number of mild variants exist. Most varieties are generally rated at 30,000 to 50,000 Scoville units, although some are rated at 20,000 or less.

In cuisine 

Cayenne powder may be a blend of different types of chili peppers. It is used in its fresh form, or as dried powder on seafood, all types of egg dishes (devilled eggs, omelettes, soufflés), meats and stews, casseroles, cheese dishes, hot sauces, and curries. In North America, the primary cultivar in Crushed Red Pepper is Cayenne.  They are also used in some varieties of hot sauce in North America, such as Franks RedHot, Texas Pete and Crystal.

See also 
 Chili powder
 List of Capsicum cultivars
 Sialagogue

Notes

References

Further reading 

 

Chili peppers
Medicinal plants of North America
Medicinal plants of South America
Spices
Capsicum cultivars